Anthony Samuel Magistrale is a professor in English at the University of Vermont since 1983. He received a B.A. in 1974 from Allegheny College, and from the University of Pittsburgh an M.A. in 1976 and a PhD in 1981. He has written several books about Stephen King and Edgar Allan Poe.

In 2000 King employed Magistrale as a research assistant.

King sets many of his stories in the fictional town of Derry, Maine. Many writers report that King told Magistrale that Derry is based heavily on Bangor, Maine, his home town.

He is also a poet. In 2011, he received  Literary Laundry's Award of Distinction for his poem "Dora Maar".

As an expert on King's work he has been called upon to provide commentary tracks when movies based on King's work are released on video. He contributed audio commentary when Maximum Overdrive was released on Blu-ray in 2018.

References

External links
"Dora Maar" at the Literary Laundry website.

Year of birth missing (living people)
Living people
University of Vermont faculty
Allegheny College alumni
Literary critics of English
University of Pittsburgh alumni
American academics of English literature